The Adventure Begins can refer to:

Greyhawk: The Adventure Begins, a sourcebook for the Dungeons & Dragons role-playing game
Buzz Lightyear of Star Command: The Adventure Begins, a 2000 animated film
Geng: The Adventure Begins, a 2009 animated film
Remo Williams: The Adventure Begins, a 1985 action-adventure film
Thomas & Friends: The Adventure Begins, a 2015 animated film
Ultraman: The Adventure Begins, a 1981 animated movie
"The Adventure Begins", the premiere episode of the Dino-Riders cartoon television serial